Mala Seidemynukha is a village in Beryslav Raion (district) in Kherson Oblast of southern Ukraine, at about  north-northeast from the centre of Kherson city, on the left bank of the Inhulets river. It belongs to Kalynivske settlement hromada, one of the hromadas of Ukraine.

The settlement came under attack by Russian forces during the Russian invasion of Ukraine in 2022.

References

Villages in Chuhuiv Raion